The Balloonatic is a 1923 American short comedy film co-directed by and starring Buster Keaton. It was one of Keaton's final short films.

Plot
A young man (Keaton) has a series of encounters in an amusement area, much like Coney Island, until happening upon a group of men preparing a gas balloon for launch. The young man assists the group by climbing atop the balloon to affix a pennant, when the balloon mistakenly takes flight with no one aboard but the young man. The young man finally downs the balloon in a wilderness area, where he encounters a young outdoorswoman and proceeds to have a series of misadventures.

Cast
 Buster Keaton as The Young Man
 Phyllis Haver as The Young Woman
 Babe London as Fat Girl at The House of Trouble (uncredited)

See also
 Buster Keaton filmography

References

External links

 The Balloonatic at the International Buster Keaton Society

1923 films
1923 short films
1923 comedy films
American silent short films
American black-and-white films
American aviation films
Silent American comedy films
Films directed by Buster Keaton
Films directed by Edward F. Cline
Films produced by Joseph M. Schenck
Films with screenplays by Buster Keaton
Films set on balloons
American comedy short films
1920s American films